Vietnam competed at the 2017 World Games held in Wrocław, Poland.

Medalists

Ju-jitsu 

Vietnam competed in the women's duo event.

Muay Thai 

Bùi Yến Ly won the gold medal in the women's 51 kg event.

References 

Nations at the 2017 World Games
2017 in Vietnamese sport
Vietnam at multi-sport events